The 1979 Paris–Roubaix was the 77th edition of the Paris–Roubaix cycle race and was held on 8 April 1979. The race started in Compiègne and finished in Roubaix. The race was won by Francesco Moser of the Sanson team.

General classification

References

Paris–Roubaix
Paris-Roubaix
Paris-Roubaix
Paris-Roubaix
Paris-Roubaix